Nathaniel Kirtman III is an American businessperson and former American football player. , he is a consultant for Blue Green Technologies. Previously, he was senior vice president for corporate public relations at NBC Entertainment.

Early life and education
Kirtman went to Saint Mary's College High School, a private school in Berkeley, California. He then attended Pomona College, where he majored in government and played football for the Pomona-Pitzer Sagehens. He graduated in 1992.

Football career
Kirtman was drafted in the ninth round of the 1992 NFL Draft by the Dallas Cowboys.

Business career
Kirtman began working for NBC Entertainment in 1998. Between 2002 and 2006, he worked for General Electric. He then returned to NBC, and in 2012 was promoted to senior vice president for corporate public relations. He left NBC in 2015. , he is a consultant for Blue Green Technologies, a water technology company that seeks to prevent algal blooms. He is a member of the California Lottery Commission, and was previously its chair. He is also on the board of trustees of Pomona and St. Mary's.

Personal life 
, Kirtman lives in the Sherman Oaks neighborhood of Los Angeles. He is a Democrat.

References

21st-century American businesspeople
Dallas Cowboys players
NBC executives
Pomona College alumni
Pomona-Pitzer Sagehens football players
Pomona College trustees
Living people
Year of birth missing (living people)
People from Sherman Oaks, Los Angeles
American public relations people